Walala may refer to:

People
 Felipe Seymour (born 1987), Chilean footballer
Walala Tjapaltjarri, Australian artist
Camille Walala (born 1975), French artist

Places
Walala, Central Province, Sri Lanka
Walala Megodagammedda, Sri Lanka
Walalawela, Sri Lanka